Events from the year 1660 in art.

Events
November – The Dutch Gift: a collection including 28 mostly Italian Renaissance paintings and a dozen classical sculptures is presented to the newly restored King Charles II of England by the States-General of the Netherlands.
To circumvent restrictions placed by the Amsterdam painters' guild on bankrupts trading as painters, Rembrandt's son Titus van Rijn and mistress Hendrickje Stoffels set up a business as art dealers, nominally employing Rembrandt.

Paintings

Aelbert Cuyp – approximate date
The Maas at Dordrecht
River Landscape with Horseman and Peasants
Allaert van Everdingen – Nordic Landscape with a Castle on a Hill (approximate date)
Rembrandt
Ahasuerus and Haman at the Feast of Esther
David and Saul 
Self Portrait
Titus the Artist's Son
Jan Steen – An interior with the artist eating oysters and Skittle Players outside an Inn 
Samuel Dirksz van Hoogstraten – A Peepshow with Views of the Interior of a Dutch House (approximate date)
Velázquez – Infanta Margarita Teresa in a Pink Dress (completed (or perhaps painted) after the death of Velázquez by his pupil Juan Bautista Martínez del Mazo)
Jan Vermeer
Girl Interrupted at Her Music
The Girl with the Wine Glass
View of Delft

Births

January 27 - Felice Cignani, Italian painter from Bologna (died 1724), son of Carlo Cignani
March - Franz Joseph Feuchtmayer, German sculptor and stuccoist (died 1718)
March 28 - Arnold Houbraken, Dutch painter and writer from Dordrecht (died 1719)
April 24 - Cornelis Dusart, Dutch  genre  painter, draftsman, and printmaker (died 1704)
By May - Anne Killigrew, English poet and painter (died 1685)
June 17 - Jan van Mieris, Dutch painter (died 1690)
date unknown
Antonio Amorosi, Italian painter, active in Ascoli Piceno and Rome (died 1738)
Francesco Bruni, Italian engraver (died unknown)
John Closterman, portrait painter (died 1711)
John Faber the Elder,  Dutch portrait engraver active in London (died 1721)
Cesare Fantetti, Italian designer and etcher (died unknown)
Christopher Elias Heiss, German painter and printmaker (died 1731)
Pellegrino Antonio Orlandi, art historian (died 1727)
Gao Qipei, Chinese painter of landscapes and figures (died 1734)
Tobias Querfurt, German painter, draughtsman, and engraver (died 1734)
Giovanni Camillo Sagrestani, Florentine painter (died 1731)
Chen Shu, Chinese painter (died 1736)
Jerzy Siemiginowski-Eleuter, Polish painter and engraver (died 1711)
probable
Andrés Pérez, Spanish Baroque painter (died 1727)
Johann Gustav Stockenberg, Swedish sculptor and stonemason (died 1710)
Peter Strudel, Austrian sculptor and painter (died 1714)
Jan Joost van Cossiau, Flemish landscape painter and engraver (died 1732)
Adriaen van Salm, Dutch draftsman and painter (died 1720)

Deaths

January 1 - Pieter Claesz, Dutch still life painter (born 1597)
January 16 - Peter Wtewael, Dutch painter, son of Joachim Wtewael (born 1596)
February 2 - Govert Flinck, Dutch painter of the Dutch Golden Age (born 1615)
February 10 - Judith Leyster, Dutch painter of Haarlem (born 1609)
March 5 - Felice Ficherelli, Italian painter active in Tuscany (born 1605)
March 9 - Hieronymus Joachims, Austrian painter (born 1619)
April 6 - Michelangelo Cerquozzi, Italian painter of small canvases of genre scenes (born 1602)
July 2 - Francesco Maffei, Italian painter characterized by provincial stylistic quirks (born 1605)
July 27 - Giovanni Battista Vanni, Italian painter of frescoes and engraver (born 1599)
August 2 - Agostino Mitelli, Italian painter of quadratura (born 1609)
August 6 - Diego Velázquez, Spanish painter (born 1599)
September 22 - Pieter de Ring, Dutch painter famous for his opulent, flashy still lifes (born 1615)
October 4 - Francesco Albani, Italian painter (born 1578)
October 20 - Claude Deruet, French painter (born 1588)
November 30 - Caterina Ginnasi, Italian painter of altarpieces for the church of Santa Lucia alle Botteghe Oscure (born 1590)
date unknown
Esteban March, Spanish painter (born 1590)
Filippo d'Angeli, Italian painter of battle scenes with small figures (born 1600)
Giacomo Cavedone, Italian painter of the Bolognese School (born 1577)
Alexander Cooper, English Baroque miniature painter (born 1609)
Giovanni Battista Discepoli, Italian painter who was crippled (born 1590)
Bernardino Gagliardi, Italian painter of the Baroque period (born 1609)
Richard Tassel,  French painter (born 1582)
probable 
Giuseppe Caletti, Italian painter and engraver (born 1600)
Antonio Rocca, Italian painter in Rome who became a monk (date of birth unknown)
Juan Valdelmira de Leon, Spanish of primarily still-life paintings of fruit and flowers (born 1630)
Jan Baptist Weenix, Dutch Golden Age painter (born 1621)

References

 
Years of the 17th century in art
1660s in art